"Cop Car" is a song written by Zach Crowell, Sam Hunt, and Matt Jenkins and recorded by New Zealand-born Australian country music singer Keith Urban. It was released in January 2014 as the third international single and fourth overall from Urban's 2013 album Fuse.

Content
The song is a mid-tempo ballad about two young lovers who are arrested when trespassing together, and "f[a]ll in love in the back of a cop car".

Critical reception
Joseph Hudak of Country Weekly gave the song a B+ grade, saying that "[it]t's a clever concept, elevated to near greatness by its sheer originality." He praised Urban's "earnest" vocals, and said that "the production is slick and alive—though not necessarily squarely 'country'." Kevin John Coyne of Country Universe gave it an identical rating, saying that he did not believe its storyline, but said that "Keith Urban’s heartfelt delivery and careful choice of what lines to emphasize keep the proceedings grounded.  He’s so effective at capturing the feeling of falling in love that the specifics of the event surrounding the moment are appropriately secondary to the emotions at play." Thom Jurek of AllMusic wrote that "[t]he muted drum loop that fuels the shimmering 'Cop Car,' is layered in atmospherics worthy of Achtung Baby, but the melody is pure country."

The song was nominated for Best Country Solo Performance at the 57th Grammy Awards but lost to Carrie Underwood's "Something in the Water".

Chart performance
"Cop Car" peaked at number eight on the US Billboard Country Airplay chart in May 2014, making it his lowest-peaking single on that chart since 1999. As of June 2014, the song has sold 772,000 copies in the US. On June 20, 2014, the single was certified platinum by the Recording Industry Association of America (RIAA) for sales of over a million digital units in the United States.

Music video
The music video was directed by John Urbano and premiered in January 2014.

Personnel
Compiled from liner notes.

Zach Crowell — programming, electric guitar, acoustic guitar, bass guitar, piano, percussion, synthesizer, background vocals
John Fields — bass guitar
Devin Malone — dobro, pedal steel guitar, electric guitar
Chris McHugh — drums
Russell Terrell — background vocals
Keith Urban — all vocals, electric guitar, EBow

Charts

Weekly charts

Year-end charts

Certifications

Sam Hunt version

Sam Hunt—who co-wrote the song originally—recorded his version of it on his debut studio album Montevallo, which was released on October 27, 2014.

Hunt explains that the reason he included the song on his album is because "After writing the songs on the record, it was like a movie, and "Cop Car" was a pivotal scene in that movie. Even though Keith Urban had recorded it, I felt it still had a place on the record."

Chart performance

Certifications

References

2014 singles
Keith Urban songs
Songs written by Zach Crowell
Songs written by Matt Jenkins
Songs written by Sam Hunt
Capitol Records Nashville singles
2013 songs
Sam Hunt songs
Song recordings produced by Shane McAnally
Songs about cars
Country ballads